Zeev Rudnick or Ze'ev Rudnick (born 1961 in Haifa, Israel) is a mathematician, specializing in number theory and in mathematical physics, notably quantum chaos. Rudnick is a professor at the School of Mathematical Sciences and the Cissie and Aaron Beare Chair in Number Theory at Tel Aviv University.

Education
Rudnick received his PhD from Yale University in 1990 under the supervision of Ilya Piatetski-Shapiro and Roger Evans Howe.

Career
Rudnick joined Tel Aviv University in 1995, after working as an assistant professor at Princeton and Stanford. In 2003–4 Rudnick was a Leverhulme visiting professor at the University of Bristol and in 2008–2010 and 2015–2016 he was a member of the Institute for Advanced Study at Princeton.

In 2012, Rudnick was inducted as a fellow of the American Mathematical Society.

Research 

Rudnick has been studying different aspects of quantum chaos and number theory. He has contributed to one of the discoveries concerning the Riemann zeta function, namely, that the Riemann zeros appear to display the same statistics as those which are believed to be present in energy levels of quantum chaotic systems and described by random matrix theory. Together with Peter Sarnak, he has formulated the Quantum Unique Ergodicity conjectures for eigenfunctions on negatively curved manifolds, and has investigated the question arising from Quantum Chaos in other arithmetic models such as the Quantum Cat map (with Par Kurlberg) and the flat torus (with CP Hughes and with Jean Bourgain). Another interest is the interface between function field arithmetic and corresponding problems in number fields.

Education 

Ph.D., 1990, Yale University.
M.Sc., 1985, The Hebrew University, Jerusalem.
B.Sc., 1984, Bar-Ilan University, Ramat Gan.

Awards and fellowships 

ERC Advanced Grants, 1.7 million euro, 2013–2018., 2019–2024.
Fellow of the American Mathematical Society, 2012–.
Annales Henri Poincaré Distinguished Paper Award for the year, 2011.
Erdős Prize of the Israel Mathematical Union, 2001.
Alon Fellow, 1995.
Sloan Foundation Doctoral Dissertation Fellowship, 1989–1990.

Selected works 

Z. Rudnick, P. Sarnak, The behaviour of eigenstates of arithmetic hyperbolic manifolds, Comm. in Math. Physics 161, 195–213 (1994).
W. Luo, Z. Rudnick and P. Sarnak, On Selberg's eigenvalue conjecture, Geom. and Func. Analysis  5 (1995), 387–401. 
Z. Rudnick and P. Sarnak, Zeros of principal L-functions and random matrix theory, Duke Mathematical Journal 81 (1996), 269–322 (special volume in honor of J. Nash).
P. Kurlberg and Z. Rudnick, Hecke theory and equidistribution for the quantization of linear maps of the torus, Duke Mathematical Journal 103 (2000), 47–78.
Z. Rudnick and K. Soundararajan, Lower bounds for moments of L-functions, Proc. of the National Academy of Sciences of the USA, 102 (19), (May 10, 2005), 6837–6838.
Z. Rudnick, What is Quantum Chaos?, Notices of the AMS, 55 number 1 (2008), 32–34.
J. Bourgain and Z. Rudnick, Restriction of toral eigenfunctions to hypersurfaces, C.R. Math. Acad. Sci. Paris 347 (2009), no 21–22, 1249–1253.
Jonathan P. Keating and Zeev Rudnick, The variance of the number of prime polynomials in short intervals and in residue classes. International Mathematics Research Notices 2012; doi: 10.1093/imrn/rns220. 
Alexei Entin, Edva Roditty-Gershon and Zeev Rudnick, Low-lying zeros of quadratic Dirichlet L-functions, hyper-elliptic curves and Random Matrix Theory, Geom. Funct. Anal. 23 (2013), no. 4, 1230–1261. doi:10.1007/s00039-013-0241-8

References

External links 
Zeev Rudnick's homepage 
Articles by Zeev Rudnick on the Arxiv
Reviews of publications by Zeev Rudnick by the American Mathematical Society

1961 births
Living people
Israeli mathematicians
People from Tel Aviv
Fellows of the American Mathematical Society
Yale University alumni
Number theorists
Academic staff of Tel Aviv University
Bar-Ilan University alumni
Hebrew University of Jerusalem alumni
Erdős Prize recipients